Larned can refer to:

 Charles Larned (died 1834), lawyer, military officer, and politician
 Josephus Nelson Larned (1836-1913), American journalist, educator, librarian, historian
 Larned B. Asprey
 Scott Larned (1969–2005), keyboardist
 Simon Larned (1753–1817), U.S. Representative from Massachusetts
 William Larned, American tennis player

See also
 Larned, Kansas, a small city in the United States
 Fort Larned National Historic Site
 Fort Larned (horse), American Thoroughbred racehorse